Sergio Vergara is the name of:

 Sergio Vergara (fencer) (born 1927), Chilean Olympic fencer
 Sergio Vergara (Paraguayan footballer) (born 1988), Paraguayan international footballer
 Sergio Vergara (Chilean footballer) (born 1994), Chilean footballer

See also
Vergara (surname)